George Ogăraru (born 3 February 1980 in Bucharest) is a retired Romanian footballer and current manager who holds a UEFA Pro Licence. His position on the pitch was right defender.

Club career

Ogăraru is one of the players that were promoted by Steaua București's youth club. He started his professional football career playing for Steaua at 18 years old. He debuted in Divizia A on 28 November 1998 in a victory against Olimpia Satu Mare with 3–0. In his first and second seasons at Steaua he was a substitute player and played only 7 games but did not score any goals.

In the 2000–2001 season he was signed by CSM Reșița in Liga II, where he played in 25 games and scored once.

He came back in the next season 2001–2002 in Liga 1 not playing for Steaua or Reșița but for Oțelul Galați. There he played 20 games and scored a goal.

In 2002 when Mihai Stoica, the president of Oțelul Galați became the general manager of Steaua, he took Ogăraru with him at his first team. Ogăraru became a basic player in Steaua's first eleven and in a few years his value grew very much. On 7 June 2006 Ogararu won the Divizia A Championship and also played his last game for FCSB in the win against FC Vaslui with 4–0.

He played for FCSB in UEFA Cup in 30 games but did not score any goal. The best seasons in UEFA Cup were in 2004–2005 when they qualified from the groups and succeeded to eliminate in the next tour Valencia, the ex-winner of UEFA Cup and especially in the season 2005–2006 when they played in the semifinals but they were defeated by Middlesbrough after the away-match in England ended 4–2 for Boro.

He played in Romania's Divizia A for Romanian giants Steaua București between 1998 and 2000 and again between 2002 and 2003, winning the Cupa României in 1999.

After his move to Ajax he declared that he will one day return to FCSB.

Ajax
In the summer break of 2006 Ajax signed Ogăraru. He debuted for Ajax in an official game on 20 August 2006 against RKC Waalwijk and his team won, 5–0. On 13 August 2006 Ajax, with Ogăraru on the field from the first minute, won the Johan Cruijff-schaal against PSV Eindhoven with 3–1. The goals for Ajax were scored by Mauro Rosales, Kenneth Perez and Wesley Sneijder, for PSV Eindhoven scored Philip Cocu. Ogăraru played only 45 minutes.

The second trophy won by Ogararu with Ajax was the Dutch Cup (KNVB Cup) after eliminating AZ in the final after a penalty shoot-out (he scored there).

On 15 November 2006 he visited his old teammates from FCSB, wishing them good luck against Dynamo Kyiv in the UEFA Champions League match and hoping that they would not be facing each other in the UEFA Cup, if FCSB does not get past the group stage. The Johan Cruijff-schaal was successfully defended in 2007 with a win against PSV Eindhoven, 1–0. Ogăraru played 25 minutes being injured and was immediately substituted.

FCSB comeback
On 30 August 2008 he was loaned out to FCSB. In June 2009 he returned to Ajax.

Sion
On 30 June 2010 Sion signed the Romanian right-back from Ajax on a free transfer until 30 June 2012.

Seattle Sounders FC
Ogăraru was training with Seattle Sounders FC of Major League Soccer. On 9 September 2012 he was on the Sounders' bench for their reserves match against Chivas USA, then subbed on for fellow trialist Eiður Guðjohnsen to start the second half.

International career
Ogăraru earned his first cap for Romania on 26 March 2005, in a 2–0 loss against the Netherlands. After that match, Victor Pițurcă repeatedly dropped Ogăraru from the squad saying that he had an average performance at Ajax Amsterdam.

He was called up by Pițurcă after 2 years and 6 months, on 9 October 2007 against Netherlands, the same team against which he played his last game for Romania. Ogăraru said that he knows the Dutch very well because he plays for Ajax in Eredivisie and most of his club teammates are also called for the Netherlands national football team.

Before the match his teammates from Ajax, Hedwiges Maduro and Urby Emanuelson, teased him and told him not to play good against them.

Romania with 1–0 and the Romania national football team had enough points to qualify in the next round of Euro 2008, together with the Netherlands and leaving Bulgaria out of the next phase of the competition.

Statistics

Honours

Managerial statistics

Personal life
Marius Lăcătuș became the godfather of Ogăraru's second child on 6 January 2007. He is also the godfather of Eric, Ogăraru's first child.

On 16 November 2007, Ogăraru launched his own website, with photos and videos from official matches and training sessions. He also has a blog in which he talks with his fans. The site has two versions, one in English and one in Romanian.

References

External links
  
  
 
 
 

1980 births
Living people
Footballers from Bucharest
Romanian footballers
Association football defenders
FC Steaua București players
CSM Reșița players
ASC Oțelul Galați players
AFC Ajax players
FC Sion players
Liga I players
Eredivisie players
Swiss Super League players
Romanian expatriate footballers
Expatriate footballers in the Netherlands
Romanian expatriate sportspeople in the Netherlands
Expatriate footballers in Switzerland
Romania international footballers
Romanian football managers
Romanian expatriate football managers
FC Universitatea Cluj managers